Kristina Guncheva (born ) is a Bulgarian female volleyball player. She plays as a setter for the Bulgaria women's national volleyball team and  Romania.

She was part of the Bulgarian national team at the 2015 FIVB Volleyball Women's U23 World Championship, 2015 FIVB World Grand Prix, and 2017 FIVB World Grand Prix.

She competed at the 2018 Women's European Volleyball Championship preliminaries.

Clubs 

 🇭🇺 Tf Aluprof (Hungary) 2014
 🇹🇷 Ordu Telekom (Turkey) 2015 
  Volley Köniz (2016)
  Levski Sofia (2018)
 🇹🇩 Sciinta Bacau (Romania) 2019

References 

1994 births
Living people
Bulgarian women's volleyball players
Place of birth missing (living people)
Setters (volleyball)
Expatriate volleyball players in Switzerland
Bulgarian expatriate sportspeople in Switzerland